Mike Grenville Griffith, (born 25 November 1943) is a former English first-class cricketer, who played for and captained Sussex County Cricket Club. A middle-order right-handed batsman, he also kept wicket occasionally.

Griffith was born at Beaconsfield, Buckinghamshire, the son of the Sussex and England wicket-keeper and cricket administrator Billy Griffith. He was educated at Ludgrove School followed by Marlborough College and Magdalene College, Cambridge. He played first for Sussex in 1962, then for Cambridge University for three years from 1963, winning his blue all three years. In 1968 he succeeded Jim Parks as county captain during the season, and continued as captain until 1972. He stood down from the captaincy after 1972.

Griffith took part in several lesser cricket tours, none of them including representative cricket. He also played frequently for the Marylebone Cricket Club (MCC) sides. He was the President of MCC for 2012–3.

An all-round sportsman, he played hockey for both Cambridge University and England and also won a Blue for rackets.

References

External links

1943 births
Living people
People educated at Marlborough College
Alumni of Magdalene College, Cambridge
English cricketers
Sussex cricketers
Marylebone Cricket Club cricketers
Sussex cricket captains
Cambridge University cricketers
International Cavaliers cricketers
Presidents of the Marylebone Cricket Club
A. E. R. Gilligan's XI cricketers
Young England cricketers
Marylebone Cricket Club President's XI cricketers
People educated at Ludgrove School